David Neil Twohy (born October 18, 1955) is an American film director and screenwriter.

Early life
Twohy was born in Los Angeles County, California. He attended college at California State University, Long Beach, graduating with a degree in radio/television/film.

Career
His most notable filmmaking credits have been writing The Fugitive, Waterworld, and GI Jane, but he is mostly known for writing and directing The Arrival and, with the exception of Pitch Black which he simply co-wrote, most entries in Chronicles of Riddick.

He has a cameo in Below as the British captain of the rescue ship.

Riddick: Furya, the fourth installment of Pitch Black was announced in February 2023. Twohy has written the script and will direct the film.

Filmography

References

External links
 
 

1955 births
American male screenwriters
California State University, Long Beach alumni
Science fiction film directors
Living people
Writers from Los Angeles
Film directors from Los Angeles
Screenwriters from California